Warm Spring Run is an  non-navigable tributary stream of the Potomac River in Morgan County of West Virginia's Eastern Panhandle. It rises on the eastern side of Warm Springs Ridge (1,115 feet) and parallels U.S. Route 522 for most of its course. Warm Spring Run enters the Potomac River at Hancock. Warm Spring Run is primarily fed by springs on Warm Springs Ridge, the best-known of these being the springs at Berkeley Springs State Park in Berkeley Springs through which it flows.

Tributaries
Dry Run

List of cities and towns along Warm Spring Run
Berkeley Springs
Berryville
Burnt Factory
Hancock
Jimtown
North Berkeley

See also
List of rivers of West Virginia

References

Rivers of Morgan County, West Virginia
Rivers of West Virginia
Tributaries of the Potomac River